Events in the year 1925 in Brazil.

Incumbents

Federal government 
 President: Artur Bernardes 
 Vice President: Estácio de Albuquerque Coimbra

Governors 
 Alagoas: Pedro da Costa Rego
 Amazonas: Alfredo Sá
 Bahia: Góis Calmon
 Ceará: José Moreira da Rocha
 Goiás:
 till 14 July: Miguel da Rocha Lima
 from 14 July: Brasil Caiado
 Maranhão: Godofredo Mendes Viana
 Mato Grosso: Estêvão Alves Correia
 Minas Gerais: Fernando de Mello Viana
 Pará: 
 till 1 February: Antônio Emiliano de Sousa
 from 1 February: Dionísio Bentes
 Paraíba: João Suassuna
 Paraná: Caetano Munhoz da Rocha
 Pernambuco: Sérgio Teixeira Lins de Barros Loreto
 Piauí: Matias Olímpio de Melo
 Rio Grande do Norte: José Augusto Bezerra de Medeiros
 Rio Grande do Sul: Antônio Augusto Borges de Medeiros
 Santa Catarina:
 São Paulo: 
 Sergipe:

Vice governors 
 Rio Grande do Norte:
 São Paulo:

Events 
12 April - The Coluna Prestes movement is launched at a meeting in Foz do Iguaçu.

Arts and culture

Films 
Aitaré da Praia, directed by Gentil Roiz and starring José Amaro
Quando Elas Querem, directed by Eugenio Centenaro Kerrigan and starring Luiz de Barros
La Mujer de medianoche, directed by Carlo Campogalliani and starring Paulo Benedetti

Births 
23 October - Cardinal José Freire Falcão (died 2021)

Deaths 
28 May - João Pinheiro Chagas, journalist and politician, Prime Minister of Portugal (born 1863)
28 August - João Ghelfi, painter (born 1890)
8 December - Mário de Alencar, poet, short story writer, journalist, lawyer and novelist (born 1872)

References

See also 
1925 in Brazilian football

 
1920s in Brazil
Years of the 20th century in Brazil
Brazil
Brazil